You're the Best Thing That Ever Happened to Me is a studio album by country music artist Ray Price. It was released in 1974 by Columbia Records. The album peaked on Billboard magazine's country album chart at No. 24.

Track listing
All songs written by Jim Weatherly.

Side A
 "The Need to Be" (3:35)
 "You Are a Song" (3:09)
 "It Must Be Love This Time" (3:00)
 "Where Peaceful Waters Flow" (3:29)
 "To a Gentler Time (3:02)

Side B
 "You're the Best Thing That Ever Happened to Me" (3:46)
 "Some Things Never Change" (4:14)
 "Storms of Troubled Times" (4:02)
 "Like a First Time Thing" (2:29)
 "Jesus Is My Kind of People" (3:22)

References

1974 albums
Ray Price (musician) albums
Columbia Records albums